Antonio Di Nardo (born 30 September 1998) is an Italian footballer who plays as a forward for Sona Calcio.

Club career
Di Nardo started his career at Latina. In 2015 he was signed by Sampdoria for €1 million fee (net of VAT), on a 3-year contract. On the same day, Marco Marchionni moved in the opposite direction on a free transfer.

In the summer of 2016, Di Nardo returned to Latina, and was assigned the number 6 shirt of the first team. He played 6 times during the 2016–17 Serie B season. He also played for the reserve team.

On 15 July 2017 Di Nardo and Criscuolo were signed by Arezzo on temporary basis. On the same day, Arezzo youngster Riccardo Aramini joined Sampdoria outright.

On 25 January 2019 he joined Lucchese on loan until the end of the 2018–19 season.

On 3 September 2019 he was loaned to Vis Pesaro.

On 5 October 2020 he returned on his second loan to Arezzo.

On 20 September 2021, he signed with Sona Calcio in Serie D.

References

External links
 

1998 births
Footballers from Naples
Living people
Italian footballers
Association football forwards
Latina Calcio 1932 players
S.S. Arezzo players
S.S.D. Lucchese 1905 players
Serie B players
Serie C players
Serie D players